Bibikov is a name of an old and influential Russian noble family. First mentioned in the 13th century, they have descended from Boyars of Tver.

Notable members
Aleksandr Bibikov (1729–1774), Russian statesman and military officer
Aleksandr Aleksandrovich Bibikov (1765-1822), Russian diplomat and military officer
Nikolai Bibikov (1842–1923), Russian general; President of Warsaw from 1892 to 1906

Russian-language surnames